Aval Potta Kolam is a 1995 Indian Tamil-language film directed by K. Vijayan for J.N.Combines. The film stars Rajesh and Ambika.

Plot

Cast 
Rajesh
Ambika

Soundtrack 
Soundtrack was composed by Chandrabose.
"Poda Nee" – Malaysia Vasudevan
"Kavalaigalai" – S. Janaki
"Enna Solla" – Vani Jairam, Malaysia Vasudevan
"Penn Sonal" – K. S. Chithra, Vani Jayaram

Release 
Even though the LP Records of songs was released in 1986, the film was released only on 8 August 1995.

References

External links 
 

1995 films
1990s Tamil-language films
Films directed by K. Vijayan
Films scored by Chandrabose (composer)